Su'a Peter Schuster (born in Apia) is a Samoan former rugby union player. He played as a flyhalf. He was the Samoa Rugby Union chairman between 2007 and 2012.

Career
Schuster was one of the players of the inaugural Marist St. Joseph side in 1970, after that Marist Rugby Club and St Joseph's Rugby Club merged.
His only international cap for Samoa was during a match against Tonga, at Apia on 13 July 1975.

Coaching career
Between 1988 and 1995, he coached Samoa national rugby union team, leading the Manu Samoa to the 1991 and 1995 Rugby World Cups. He retired from his coaching career in 1995.

References

External links
 

Year of birth missing (living people)
Living people
Samoan rugby union players
Samoan rugby union coaches
Rugby union fly-halves
Samoa international rugby union players
Samoa national rugby union team coaches